Ann Fox Chandonnet, born Ann Alicia Fox, is an American poet, journalist, book reviewer, and culinary historian.

Biography
Ann Alicia Fox was born in Lowell, Massachusetts on February 7, 1943 to Leighton Dinsmore Fox and Barbara Amelia (Cloutman) Curran. She grew up on a dairy farm in Dracut, Massachusetts and she graduated from Dracut High School, magna cum laude from Lowell State College in 1964 with a B.S. in Secondary Education and from the University of Wisconsin-Madison in 1965 with an M.A. in English Literature. She married Fernand “Fern” Leonce Chandonnet in 1966 and they have two sons, Yves and Alexandre.  She has lived in Chugiak, Alaska, Anchorage, Alaska, Vale, North Carolina, and O'Fallon, Missouri.

Her poems have appeared in anthologies and various magazines, including Permafrost, Ice Floe, Abraxas, New Kauri, MidAtlantic and Calapooya Collage. Her articles on food history have appeared in Early American Life magazine. She also had a food column in Alaska magazine.

Chandonnet worked as a reporter for the now-defunct the Anchorage Times newspaper from 1982 to 1992 and the Juneau Empire from 1999 to 2002. She taught English at Kodiak High School in Alaska from 1965 to 1966 and also taught at Lowell State College in Massachusetts from 1966 to 1969. For five years she was a publicist for a small publishing office in Anchorage.

From the cover to her book "Colonial Food": "Ann Chandonnet is a food historian, poet and journalist. She is a member of the Culinary Historians of Washington, D.C., and is the author of the award-winning "Gold Rush Grub" and "The Pioneer Village Cookbook." Chandonnet started cooking when she was 11 or 12 years old and was making meals for the family. In high school, she entered her jams and canned foods to the state fair.

Selected works
"On a Human Scale", Ploughshares, Spring 1979
"In Velvet," Kalliope: A Journal of Woman's Literature and Art, Vol. 2, No. 2, Winter 1980.
"Avalanche", Alaska Quarterly Review, Vol. 24, No. 1 & 2, Spring/Summer 2007
Jam for the Lamb, Wild Goose Poetry Review, Summer 2008
 "Sacraments in Simple Things", Wild Goose Poetry Review, Summer 2009
"Driving Black", Wild Goose Poetry Review, Fall 2011
"My Mother’s Poems & My Father’s Poems", Wild Goose Poetry Review, Winter 2011
"Saturday Night and Sunday Morning", Wild Goose Poetry Review, Fall 2012
"Sapphic", The Dead Mule School, December 2012

Poetry

Fiction
 

Non-fiction

 

Anthologies

References

Year of birth missing (living people)
Living people
University of Wisconsin–Madison alumni
Poets from Alaska
American women poets
Poets from Massachusetts
People from O'Fallon, Missouri
University of Massachusetts Lowell alumni
21st-century American women